Philotheca obovalis is a species of flowering plant in the family Rutaceae and is endemic to New South Wales. It is a small shrub with broadly egg-shaped to heart-shaped leaves with the narrower end towards the base, and white flowers tinged with pink and arranged singly in leaf axils.

Description

Taxonomy
This philotheca was first formally described in 1825 by Allan Cunningham who gave it the name Eriostemon ovalis and published the description in the chapter On the Botany of the Blue Mountains in Barron Field's book Geographical Memoirs on New South Wales. Cunningham collected the type specimens on the "verge of the Regent's Glen, Blue Mountains". In 1998, Paul G. Wilson changed the name to Philotheca obovalis in the journal Nuysia.

Distribution and habitat
Philotheca obovalis grows in heath on sandstone, mainly in the Blue Mountains of eastern New South Wales.

References

obovalis
Flora of New South Wales
Sapindales of Australia
Plants described in 1837
Taxa named by Allan Cunningham (botanist)